Davenham is a civil parish in Cheshire West and Chester, England.  It contains 28 buildings that are recorded in the National Heritage List for England as designated listed buildings.  Other than the village of Davenham, the parish is rural, and most of the buildings in the list are domestic or related to farming.  Running through the parish are the Trent and Mersey Canal, the River Weaver and the Weaver Navigation, and the West Coast Main Line; there are structures relating to all these in the list.  The other listed buildings are the village church and associated structures, two public houses, and a memorial drinking fountain.

Key

Buildings

See also
Listed buildings in Bostock
Listed buildings in Byley
Listed buildings in Hartford
Listed buildings in Lach Dennis
Listed buildings in Moulton
Listed buildings in Northwich
Listed buildings in Rudheath
Listed buildings in Whitegate and Marton

References
Citations

Sources

Listed buildings in Cheshire West and Chester
Lists of listed buildings in Cheshire